Manuels River Formation is a Middle Cambrian (Drumian) geological formation cropping out in the Random Island area of Newfoundland and elsewhere?.  Its black/dark brown, finely laminated mudstones and thicker-bedded siltstones are occasionally interrupted by thin yellowish silty limestone horizons.

Fossil content 
Recorded fossils include  Clarella venusta (Billings, 1872) and Mawddachites hicksii (Salter, 1864).

References 

Geologic formations of Canada
Cambrian System of North America
Cambrian Newfoundland and Labrador
Geology of Newfoundland and Labrador